State Road 6563 (NM 6563), also known as the Sunspot Scenic Byway, is a  two-lane state highway in Otero County, New Mexico, United States.

Route description 
NM 6563 begins at the National Solar Observatory at Sunspot in the Lincoln National Forest. It then travels northward to its northern terminus at NM 130.

NM 6563 is one of only three four-digit state highways in New Mexico (the others being NM 1113 and NM 5001). It takes its number from the wavelength of the Hydrogen-alpha spectral line (6563 Å) used by scientists at the observatory to study the solar chromosphere and to locate solar flares on the Sun.

The solar observatory added signs along the highway in 2011 with the names of the planets as part of a 1:250 million model of the distances between planets in the Solar System.

History 
The highway was designated a National Forest scenic byway on October 6, 1990.

Major intersections

See also

References

External links

New Mexico Tourism Website

Transportation in Otero County, New Mexico
6563
National Forest Scenic Byways